M. Yaqub Mirza (born 1946 in Karachi, Pakistan) is a Herndon, Virginia-based businessman and Islamic activist.

Background 
Muhammad Yaqub Mirza holds a MSc from the University of Karachi (1969), and a PhD in Physics (1974) and M.A. in Teaching Science (1975) from the University of Texas at Dallas. His doctoral thesis was entitled Multiphoton Ionization of Cesium Through Resonant Dissociative States of Cs2 and his thesis advisor was Carl B. Collins.

Mirza was a co-founder of the International Institute of Islamic Thought. Mirza was a co-founder and trustee (1984–2003) of Amana Mutual Funds Trust, a Bellingham, Washington-based mutual fund that operates in accordance with Sharia financial principles. Since 1998, he has been President and CEO of Sterling Management Group, Inc (SMG).

Lecturing career 
Mirza lectures on Islamic finance and Entrepreneurship and has spoken at several institutions.

Legal issues and political activity 
In 2002, Mirza's offices were raided by the FBI as part of an investigation into money laundering and terrorism, although Mirza was not charged with any crime as a result of this.

Mirza and Sterling Group are active financial supporters of the Republican party in Virginia.

References

External links 
 NameBase – M Yaqub Mirza (Archive)
 Cooperative Research – Yacub Mirza

1946 births
Living people
University of Karachi alumni
Pakistani emigrants to the United States
University of Texas at Dallas alumni
American people of Pakistani descent
American businesspeople
Businesspeople from Karachi
People from Herndon, Virginia